"One of These Days" is the opening track from Pink Floyd's 1971 album Meddle. The composition is instrumental except for the spoken line from drummer Nick Mason, "One of these days, I'm going to cut you into little pieces." It features double-tracked bass guitars played by David Gilmour and Roger Waters, with each bass hard panned into one channel of stereo, but one bass sound is quite muted and dull. According to Gilmour, this is because that particular instrument had old strings on it, and the roadie they had sent to get new strings for it wandered off to see his girlfriend instead.

Music

The predominant element of the piece is that of a bass guitar played through a delay (Binson Echorec) unit, set to produce repeats in quarter-note triplets. The result of this setting is: if the player plays simple quarter notes, the added echoes will produce a pattern of quarter note – eighth note, quarter note – eighth note. Pink Floyd would again use this technique on the bass line for "Sheep". This riff was first created by David Gilmour on guitar with effects, then Roger Waters had the idea of using bass instead of guitar, so they recorded the song on two different bass guitars.

The piece is in B minor, occasionally alternating with an A major chord.

The distinctive keyboard accents on this track are composed of three components: A Hammond organ forms the 'fade in', followed by a "Stab" composed of a second Hammond organ with percussion stop, overdubbed with an acoustic piano fed through a Leslie speaker, as was also used on "Echoes". For live versions, the 'fade in' part was played on a Farfisa organ.

The threatening lyric, a rare vocal contribution by Nick Mason, was recorded through a ring modulator and slowed down to create an eerie effect. It was aimed at Sir Jimmy Young, the then BBC Radio 1 and Radio 2 DJ who the band supposedly disliked because of his tendency to babble. During early 1970s concerts, they sometimes played a sound collage of clips from Young's radio show that was edited to sound completely nonsensical, thus figuratively "cutting him into little pieces". The bootleg compilation A Treeful of Secrets contains a demo version of "One of These Days" in which the Jimmy Young collage loops in the background during the performance. However, the authenticity of this demo has not been confirmed.

According to John Peel, Waters described "One of These Days" as a "poignant appraisal of the contemporary social situation". Gilmour said it was the most collaborative piece ever produced by the group.

A film, French Windows, was made by Ian Emes, set to the piece and featuring people and gibbons dancing against various backgrounds. After being seen on television by the band, it was back-projected by Pink Floyd during live performances and Emes was commissioned to make further films for the band.

The tune also quotes Delia Derbyshire's realisation of Ron Grainer's Doctor Who theme music from the British science fiction television series Doctor Who. This quotation is most clear in live performances, particularly in concerts on the Momentary Lapse of Reason and Division Bell tours.

Part of the song was used on the Soviet television program "Mezhdunarodnaya Panorama" ("International Panorama"). The playing of the track in the program is also discussed in Victor Pelevin's novel Omon Ra.

A similar bass riff is used during the first seconds of Brian Eno's song "Third Uncle" on the album  Taking Tiger Mountain (By Strategy).

Live performances
The song was a concert staple on the band's 1971–1973 and 1987–1994 tours. The Live at Pompeii version was retitled as "One of These Days I'm Going to Cut You into Little Pieces", the full spoken threat.

It was resurrected for the group's 1987–1989 A Momentary Lapse of Reason & Another Lapse tours and 1994's The Division Bell Tour, performed by David Gilmour on lap steel guitar, Tim Renwick on rhythm guitar, Guy Pratt on bass, Richard Wright and Jon Carin on keyboards, with Nick Mason and Gary Wallis on drums and percussion. It was included on the Delicate Sound of Thunder video (1989), CD, LP, and cassette (1988) and the Pulse album (1995) (cassette & LP only) & video & DVD (1995/2006 respectively). It is absent from the iTunes version of the Pulse album. A live version was also included on the B-side of the "High Hopes/Keep Talking" double A-side single (1994).

On 25 June 2016, David Gilmour and his solo band performed the song during their set at the Plac Wolności in Wrocław, Poland, the first time Gilmour had played it live in more than 20 years and the first time he'd ever made it part of a solo set list. Gilmour also performed the song during his concerts at the Amphitheatre of Pompeii on 7 and 8 July 2016. This performance was released as part of his Live at Pompeii live album. These concerts made One of These Days the only song played at Pink Floyd's 1971 performance and Gilmour's 2016 performance. Roger Waters played the piece in the first set of songs on his 2017 Us + Them Tour. The song also features in Nick Mason's Saucerful of Secrets show, again featuring Guy Pratt on bass.

A live version was released in 2016 on The Early Years 1965–1972, Volume 5: 1971: Reverber/ation, a live recording from a BBC radio session on 30 September 1971.

Reception
In a review for the Meddle album, Jean-Charles Costa of Rolling Stone described "One of These Days" as sticking to the usual Pink Floyd formula, but "each segment of the tune is so well done, and the whole thing coheres so perfectly that it comes across as a positive, high-energy opening."

Personnel

Pink Floyd

Meddle
 David Gilmour – electric and slide guitars, bass guitar
 Roger Waters – bass guitar
 Nick Mason – drums, vocal phrase
 Richard Wright – Hammond organ, piano, EMS VCS 3

Delicate Sound of Thunder and Pulse 
 David Gilmour – console steel guitar
 Nick Mason – drums, percussion, vocal phrase (recording)
 Richard Wright – Hammond organ, synthesiser
 Guy Pratt – bass guitar
 Gary Wallis – percussion, extra drums on Pulse
 Tim Renwick – rhythm guitar
 Jon Carin – synthesiser, programming

Pink Floyd: Live at Pompeii
 David Gilmour - slide guitar
 Roger Waters - bass, gong
 Richard Wright - Hammond organ, piano, EMS VCS 3
 Nick Mason - drums

Solo

Live at Pompeii (David Gilmour)
David Gilmour - console steel guitar, cymbals
Chester Kamen – electric guitars
Guy Pratt – bass
Greg Phillinganes – piano
Chuck Leavell – organ
Steve DiStanislao – drums, aeoliphone

"Roger Waters: Us + Them"
Roger Waters - bass 
David Kilminster - electric guitar
Gus Seyffert - bass
Jon Carin - lap steel guitar
Jonathan Wilson - electric guitar
Bo Koster - keyboards
Joey Waronker - drums, percussion
Jess Wolfe - percussion, choreography 
Holly Laessig - percussion, choreography

"Live at the Roundhouse (Nick Mason's Saucerful of Secrets)"
Nick Mason - drums, percussion
Dom Beken - keyboards
Guy Pratt - bass
Gary Kemp - electric guitar
Lee Harris - lap steel guitar

1989 promo video
A promo video was used to promote Delicate Sound of Thunder and got brief airing on MTV in 1989. It showed the band performing the track on stage at Nassau Coliseum and shots of the inflatable pig that flew over the audience during the song in the show. The end of the clip blacks out instead of segueing into "Time" as on the Delicate Sound of Thunder video.

References

External links
 French Windows, animated film by Ian Emes

Pink Floyd songs
1971 singles
British hard rock songs
Rock instrumentals
1970s instrumentals
Songs written by David Gilmour
Songs written by Nick Mason
Songs written by Richard Wright (musician)
Songs written by Roger Waters
Song recordings produced by David Gilmour
Song recordings produced by Roger Waters
Song recordings produced by Richard Wright (musician)
Song recordings produced by Nick Mason
1971 songs
Harvest Records singles
Capitol Records singles